Michelago railway station is a heritage-listed former railway station on the Bombala railway line at Michelago, Snowy Monaro Regional Council, New South Wales, Australia. The property was added to the New South Wales State Heritage Register on 2 April 1999.

History 
The station buildings were constructed by contractors Pooley and Harris, with the railway line constructed by A. Johnston and Co.

Michelago railway station opened on 8 December 1887. It officially closed on 8 February 1976.

The Australian Railway Historical Society (ACT Division) operated the Michelago Tourist Railway from Queanbeyan to Michelago from 1993; however, the deteriorating state of the line meant that services were later truncated to Royalla before being suspended entirely in 2006.

Description
The station area has three main areas, general waiting room, ticket office and ladies waiting room, plus sheds, lamp room and the yard area.

Heritage listing 
Michelago railway station was listed on the New South Wales State Heritage Register on 2 April 1999.

See also

References

Bibliography

Attribution

External links

New South Wales State Heritage Register
Disused regional railway stations in New South Wales
Articles incorporating text from the New South Wales State Heritage Register
Railway stations in Australia opened in 1887
Railway stations closed in 1976
Bombala railway line